Frances Mary Hendry (born 1941) is a British writer of children's historical fiction. Born and educated in Glasgow, Scotland she now resides in Nairn, where many of her books are set.

Writing
Hendry was a teacher for 23 years and wrote plays and pantomimes for the Nairn Drama Club. She submitted a story to the first BBC "Quest for a Kelpie" writing competition and won first prize — the book took its name from the competition. She has subsequently had 16 books published, most of which are historical fiction for young adults; historically accurate, with imaginary young people inserted into them. Two are fantasy; two are for younger readers. Several have won prizes and awards.

References

External links
 
 
  
 

1941 births
Living people
Scottish children's writers
Scottish historical novelists